Bombus pascuorum, the common carder bee, is a species of bumblebee  present in most of Europe in a wide variety of habitats such as meadows, pastures, waste ground, ditches and embankments, roads, and field margins, as well as gardens and parks in urban areas and forests and forest edges. It is similar in appearance to Bombus muscorum, and is replacing the species in Northern Britain.

Description 
The thorax of the common carder bee is either yellowish or reddish-brown in color. The hair of the first four abdominal segments are gray in color, while the hair of the fifth and sixth terga are yellowish or reddish-brown in color.

Queens measure  from wing to wing. Workers measure  from wing to wing. Drones measure  from wing to wing.

The head of the common carder bee is of medium length and the snout is long compared to other species of bumblebee.

Colony cycle 
Queens appear between early April and mid-May, and workers appear at the end of April/early May to mid-October. Young queens and drones can be found from mid-August to late October. When queens search for suitable places to nest, they fly just above the vegetation, for example on forest edges, investigating cavities such as holes in the ground or niches in dead wood and grass. The nests can be constructed above or under ground, preferably in old mouse nests, but also in bird nests, barns, and sheds.

Nest-building proceeds as follows. The queen collects moss and grass to form a small, hollow sphere whose walls are partly bonded with wax and sealed off. Within this is formed a large bowl of brown wax of about 5 mm in diameter, which is filled with pollen. Thereafter, five to 15 eggs are deposited, and the cell closed. Another 20-mm-high cup is then filled with nectar, thus serving as its own food reserve for bad weather days. After three to five days, the larvae hatch to feed on the pollen. After about a week, the larvae are mature.

The adult worker bees, owing to the initially poor supply situation, are relatively small, reaching only about half the body length of the queen and lacking functioning ovaries. Later-hatching bees are much larger. The additional nesting and brood care is dedicated solely to the queen, which no longer leaves the nest. From August, rarely before, the first fully developed females, together with drones, are ready. Drones hatch from unfertilized eggs.

Shortly after this peak, the population quickly decreases. With the queen the entire nest dies, usually in September. Occasionally, individuals survive until October/November. Only the last-hatched females survive, to mate with males. Then they fly in search of a safe place for hibernation.

Foraging 
The common carder bee is polylectic, feeding on a variety of wild flowers, including nettles (Urticaceae), genuine motherwort (Lamiaceae), Himalayan balsam (Balsaminaceae), cabbage thistle, knapweed (Asteraceae), vetches, red and white clover (Fabaceae), monkshood (Ranunculaceae), fruit trees, etc.

Gallery

References

 Goulson, D. et al. The impacts of predators and parasites on wild bumblebee colonies. The Royal Entomological Society. 2017

Bumblebees
Hymenoptera of Europe
Insects described in 1763
Taxa named by Giovanni Antonio Scopoli